Yolkonak is a village in the Beşiri District of Batman Province in Turkey. The village is populated by Kurds of the Reşkotan tribe and had a population of 71 in 2021. It is populated by both Muslims and Yazidis.

References 

Villages in Beşiri District
Kurdish settlements in Batman Province
Yazidi villages in Turkey